Jeong Yak-yong (August 5, 1762 – April 7, 1836) or Chong Yagyong, often simply known as ‘Dasan’ (茶山, one of his ‘ho’ / pen-names meaning ‘the mountain of tea’), was a Korean agronomist, philosopher, and poet. He was one of the greatest thinkers in the later Joseon period, wrote highly influential books about philosophy, science and theories of government, held significant administrative positions, and was noted as a poet. He was a close confidant of King Jeongjo and his philosophical position is often identified with the Silhak school, and his concerns are better seen as explorations of Neo-Confucian themes.

Jeong was born in Gwangju, Gyeonggi Province and died in there too. He spent 18 years in exile in Gangjin County, South Jeolla Province, from 1801 until 1818, on account of his membership of the Southerners faction, and also because of the Catholic faith of his elder brother. Korean Catholics sometimes claim that Jeong was baptized with the name John Baptist, but there is no documentary proof of this. He came from Naju Jeong clan.

At birth he was given the courtesy title (初字 choja) Gwinong (歸農), and later he was also known by the courtesy names Miyong (美鏞) and Songbu (頌甫)美庸); among his art names were Sa-am (俟菴), Tagong (籜翁), Taesu (苔叟), Jahadoin (紫霞道人), Cheolmasanin (鐵馬山人), Dasan (茶山), Yeoyudang (與猶堂, the name of his house).

Biography

Family history
Dasan's father was Jeong Jae-won (丁載遠, 1730–1792). His eldest brother Yak-hyeon (若鉉, 1751–1821) was the son of a first wife, while Jeong Yak-jong, Yak-jeon (若銓, 1758–1816), and Yak-yong were the sons of their father's second wife, Suk-in (淑人, 1730–1770) from the Haenam Yun family. There was one daughter from this second marriage. Four other daughters were later born of a third marriage.

Dasan's father's family traced their descent back to Jeong Ja-geup (丁子伋, 1423–1487) who in 1460 first took a government position under King Sejo. Eight further generations then followed his example. Jeong Si-yun (丁時潤, 1646–1713) and his second son Do-bok (道復, 1666–1720) were the last of the line, since the Southerners’ faction to which the family belonged lost power in 1694. Si-yun retired to a house in Mahyeon-ri to the east of Seoul (now known as Namyangju) in 1699, which was to be Dasan's birthplace. His eldest son, Do-tae (道泰) lived there and was Dasan's direct ancestor. The Southerners remained excluded from official positions until a brief period that began during the reign of King Jeongjo, when Dasan's father was appointed magistrate of Jinju county, thanks to his strong links with the powerful Chae Je-gong, who rose until he was appointed third state councillor in 1788. In 1762, the execution of Crown Prince Sado by his father the king so shocked Jeong Jae-won that he withdrew from official life and returned to his home in Mahyeon-ri. This explains the courtesy name Gwi’nong (‘back to farming’) his father gave Dasan, who was born in the same year. As a result, Dasan grew up receiving intense intellectual training from his now unoccupied father.

The source of Dasan's intellectual interests can be traced to the influence of the great scholar Udam Jeong Si-han (愚潭 丁時翰, 1625–1707) of the same clan, who taught Jeong Si-yun briefly and was then the main teacher of Dasan's ancestor Jeong Do-tae as well as his brother Do-je (1675–1729). One of the most significant thinkers in the next generation was the philosopher-scholar Seongho Yi Ik and he saw Udam as the authentic heir of Toegye Yi Hwang. Jeong Do-je transmitted the teachings of Udam to the next generations of the family and so they were passed to Dasan's father and Dasan himself.

Similarly, Dasan's mother was descended from the family of the famous Southerner scholar-poet Gosan Yun Seon-do (孤山 尹善道, 1587–1671). Yun's great-grandson Gongjae Yun Du-seo (恭齋 尹斗緖, 1668–1715), well known for his skills as a painter, was Dasan's maternal great-grandfather. He and his elder brother were close to Seongho Yi Ik and his brothers, and are credited with reviving the study of the Six Classics, as well as the thought of Toegye.

Early life
By the age of 6, Dasan's father was impressed by his powers of observation. By the age of 9 he had composed a small collection of poems. In 1776, Dasan was married to Hong Hwabo of the Pungsan Hong clan, the daughter of a royal secretary; in that year he moved to Seoul, where his father received an appointment in the Board of Taxation after the accession of King Jeongjo. When he was 15, Dasan was introduced to the writings of Seongho Yi Ik by one of his descendants, Yi Ga-Hwan (李家煥, 1742–1801) and his brother-in-law Yi Seung-hun and he was deeply impressed, resolving to devote his life to similar studies.
In 1783, Dasan passed the chinsagwa (literary licentiate examination), which allowed him to enter the Sungkyunkwan.

In 1784 the king was deeply impressed by the “objectivity” of Dasan's replies to a set of questions he had formulated. This was the start of an increasingly close relationship between the king and Dasan. After the promotion of Chae Je-gong in 1788, Dasan took top place in the daegwa (higher civil service exam) in 1789 and was offered a position in the Office of Royal Decrees, together with 5 other members of the Southerner faction. This alarmed members of the opposing ‘Old Doctrine’ faction, who soon realized the extent to which the Southerners were being influenced, not only by the Practical Learning introduced to China from Europe, but by Roman Catholicism itself.

In 1784, Yi Byeok, a scholar who had participated in meetings to study books about the Western (European) Learning, starting in 1777, talked with Dasan about the new religion for the first time in 1784 and gave him a book about it. Whatever his own response may have been, and there is no proof that he ever received baptism, Dasan's immediate family was deeply involved in the origins of the Korean Catholic community. His older sister was married to Yi Seung-hun, the Korean who was first baptized as a Catholic in Beijing in 1784 and played a leading role in the early years of the Church's growth. The oldest of Jeong Jae-won's sons, Yak-hyeon, was married to a sister of Yi Byeok. Another daughter, from a third marriage, later married Hwang Sa-yeong (1775–1801), author of the notorious Silk Letter. Dasan's older brother, Jeong Yak-jong (Augustinus) was the leader of the first Catholic community and one of the first victims of the purge launched against Southerners, but especially against Catholics, in 1801, after the sudden death of King Jeongjo.

In 1789, Yun Ji-chung, one of the first baptized and a cousin to Dasan on his mother's side, had gone to Beijing and received confirmation. Rome had forbidden Catholics to perform ancestral rituals and this was now being strictly applied by the Portuguese Franciscan bishop of Beijing Alexandre de Gouvea. When his mother died in 1791, Yun therefore refused to perform the usual Confucian ceremonies; this became public knowledge, he was accused of impiety and was executed. Some Koreans who had at first been sympathetic, horrified by the Church's rejection of hallowed traditions, turned away. Jeong Yak-yong may well have been among them.

Royal Service
Dasan was particularly interested in civil engineering. In 1792, the king, impressed by a pontoon bridge he had designed, asked him to design and supervise the construction of the walls for the Hwaseong Fortress (modern Suwon), which surrounded the palace where the king would live when he visited the new tomb he had constructed for his father. Dasan produced radically new techniques and structures, drawing on European, Chinese and Japanese sources. In 1794, after several promotions, the king appointed him as secret envoy to Gyeongi province, investigating reports of corruption.

Dasan's most important task in 1795, the 60th anniversary of the birth of Crown Prince Sado, was to help the King decide on a new honorary title for his father. This was a fraught enterprise, the Prince's supporters were members of what was called the Expediency subfaction while his main enemies were members of the Principle subfaction. The Southerners were strong supporters of the King's wish to honor Sado highly and the King was more than grateful. However, he then found it prudent to send Dasan away from court for a time, appointing him to be superintendent of the post station at Geumjeong, South Pyeongan province.

Here, he provided clear proof of his rejection of Catholicism by doing everything possible to persuade the Catholics working there to renounce their faith, and in particular to perform ancestral rites. Almost certainly, it was the Catholics’ rejection of Confucian ritual that had turned him against them. In 1796, he was brought back to Seoul and promoted but his many enemies continued to accuse him of supporting the pro-western Catholics and he preferred to take up a position as county magistrate at Goksan in Hwanghae province.

In 1799 he even withdrew to his family home but was summoned back to Seoul by the king in 1800.

Exile
In the summer of 1800, King Jeongjo died suddenly. The new king, King Sunjo, was still only a child of 11 and power fell into the hands of the widow of King Yeongjo, often known as Queen Dowager Kim or Queen Jeongsun. Her family belonged to the factions opposed to the reformist, often Catholic, Nam-in group and she had been completely powerless during Jeongjo's reign. She at once launched an attack on the Catholics, who were denounced as traitors and enemies of the state. Jeong Yak-jong, the older brother of Jeong Yak-yong, was the head of the Catholic community, he was one of the first to be arrested and executed, together with Yi Seung-hun, in the spring of 1801. His eldest son, Jeong Cheol-sang, died then too, executed a month after his father.

Since he was Jeong Yak-jong's younger brother, Jeong Yak-yong was sent into exile for some months in Janggi fortress in what is now Pohang, having been found after interrogation with torture not to be a Catholic believer. That might have been that, but what brought Yak-yong to Gangjin, where he was forced to spend eighteen years, was the event that served as the final nail in the coffin of the early Catholic community, the Silk Letter Incident. Hwang Sa-yeong, married to one of Dasan's younger sisters, hid in a cave during the persecutions and in October 1801 he finished writing a long letter to the bishop of Beijing, giving a detailed account of the recent events, asking him to bring pressure on the Korean authorities to allow freedom of religion and, disastrously, begging him to ask the Western nations to send a large army to overthrow the Joseon dynasty so that Korea would be subject to China, where Catholicism was permitted. The man carrying this letter, written on a roll of silk wrapped round his body, was intercepted and the Korean authorities made full use of it to show that Catholics were by definition enemies of the state.

The persecution was intensified and if it had not been very clear that Jeong Yak-yong and Jeong Yak-jeon were in no sense Catholic believers, they would surely have been executed. Instead they were sent into exile together, parting ways at Naju, from where Jeong Yak-jeon journeyed on to the island of Heuksando, Yak-yong taking the Gangjin road. His exile began in the last days of 1801, on the 23rd day of the eleventh lunar month, the 28th of December in the solar calendar. On that day, he arrived in Gangjin, South Jeolla Province. The newly arrived exile had little or no money and no friends, he found shelter in the back room of a poor, rundown tavern kept by a widow, outside the East Gate of the walled township of Gangjin, and there he lived until 1805. He called his room “Sauijae” (room of four obligations: clear thinking, serious appearance, quiet talking, sincere actions).

By 1805, much had changed in Seoul. Dowager Queen Kim had died and the young king had come of age and quickly put an end to the violence against Catholics. Three hundred had been killed and many of the rest were exiled or scattered, or had stopped practicing. Jeong Yak-yong was free to move about the Gangjin area and in the spring of 1805 he walked up the hill as far as Baeknyeon-sa Temple, where he met the Venerable Hyejang, the newly arrived monk in charge of the temple, who was about ten years younger than himself. They talked and it seems that Hyejang only realized who his visitor was as he was leaving. That night he forced him to stay with him and asked to learn the I Ching from him. They quickly became close companions.

Later the same year, Hyejang enabled Dasan to move out of the tavern and for nearly a year he lived in Boeun Sanbang, a small hermitage at the nearby Goseong-sa temple, which was under Hyejang's control. Finally, in the spring of 1808 he was able to take up residence in a house belonging to a distant relative of his mother, on the slopes of a hill overlooking Gangjin and its bay. It was a simple house, with a thatched roof, but it was there that the exile spent the remaining ten years of his exile, until the autumn of 1818. This is the site now known as “Dasan Chodang.” The hill behind the house was known locally as Da-san (tea-mountain) and that was to become the name by which our exile is best known today, Dasan. Here he could teach students who lodged in a building close to his, forming a close-knit community, and he could write. In his study he accumulated a library of over a thousand books.

During his exile he is said to have written 500 volumes. This needs qualifying, since one “work” might fill nearly 50 volumes of the standard size, but he certainly wrote a vast quantity, some 14,000 pages, mainly in order to set out clearly a fundamental reform program for governing the country correctly according to Confucian ideals. During the years of exile he concentrated first on the Book of Changes (Yi Ching), writing in 1805 the Chuyeoksajeon. A reflection on the Classic of Poetry followed in 1809. He wrote on politics, ethics, economy, natural sciences, medicine and music. After his return from exile, Dasan published his most important works: on jurisprudence Heumheumsinseo (1819); on linguistics Aeongakbi (1819); on diplomacy Sadekoryesanbo (1820); on the art of governing Mongminsimseo and on administration Gyeongsesiryeong (1822).

Dasan remained in exile in Gangjin until 1818, when he was allowed to return to his family home near Seoul. Attempts to bring him back into government service were blocked by factional politics. He used Yeoyudang as his final pen-name, it was the name of the family home where he lived quietly, near the Han River, until he died in 1836, on his sixtieth wedding anniversary. The main sources for his biography are the two versions of his own ‘epitaph,’ Jachan myojimyeong, and a chronological biography Saam seonsaeng yeonbo composed by his great-grandson Jeong Gyu-yeong using no longer extant records.

Dasan and the 19th-century tea revival
Jeong Yak-yong had been living in Gangjin for several years when the Ven. Hyejang arrived from Daeheung-sa temple to take charge of Paengnyeon-sa. During those years, spent in a poor inn with very little money, Dasan's health had suffered from the low nutritional value of his food. He suffered from chronic digestive problems. Dasan and Hyejang first met on the 17th day of the 4th month, 1805, not long after Hyejang's arrival. Only a few days after, Dasan sent a poem to Hyejang requesting some tea leaves from the hill above the temple; it is dated in the 4th month of 1805, very soon after their meeting.

This poem makes it clear that Dasan already knew the medicinal value of tea and implies that he knew how to prepare the leaves for drinking. It has often been claimed that Dasan learned about tea from Hyejang but this and a series of other poems exchanged between them suggests that in fact Hyejang and other monks in the region learned how to make a kind of caked tea from Dasan.

This would make him the main origin of the ensuing spread of interest in tea. In 1809, the Ven. Cho-ui from the same Daeheung-sa temple came to visit Dasan in Gangjin and spent a number of months studying with him there. Again, it seems more than likely that Cho-ui first learned about tea from Dasan, and adopted his very specific, rather archaic way of preparing caked tea. After that, it was the Ven. Cho-ui who, during his visit to Seoul in 1830, shared his tea with a number of scholars. Among them, some poems were written and shared to celebrate the newly discovered drink, in particular the Preface and Poem of Southern Tea (南茶幷序) by Geumryeong Bak Yeong-bo.

After this, Cho-ui became especially close to Chusa Kim Jeong-hui, who visited him several times bringing him gifts of tea during his exile in Jeju Island in the 1740s. A letter about Dasan's method of making caked tea has survived, dated 1830, that Dasan sent to Yi Si-heon 李時憲 (1803–1860), the youngest pupil taught by him during his 18 years of exile in Gangjin: “It is essential to steam the picked leaves three times and dry them three times, before grinding them very finely. Next that should be thoroughly mixed with water from a rocky spring and pounded like clay into a dense paste that is shaped into small cakes. Only then is it good to drink.”

Thought
Jeong is well-known above all for his work in synthesizing the Neo-Confucian thought of the middle Joseon dynasty.  In the process, he wrote widely in various fields including law, political theory, and the Korean Confucian classics. He sought to return Korean Confucian scholarship to a direct connection with the original thought of Confucius. He called this return to the classics "Susa" learning (수사, 洙泗), a reference to the two rivers that flowed through Confucius' homeland.

Jeong published a number of books over various areas, including his best-known Mokminsimseo (목민심서, 牧民心書, The Mind of Governing the People). Although he was deeply concerned about the problem of poverty during that time, Jeong deeply pondered the issue of poverty and raised questions about the role of government officials. He believed that the government and bureaucrats could and should play a major role in solving the problem of poverty. Dasan stressed the importance of the governor's administering the people with integrity and in a fair manner. According to him, the government was the ruling entity to render aid and favor to the people while the people were the subject of the government's sympathy and rule.

In the service of this idea, Jeong criticized the philosophers of his time for engaging in both fruitless etymological scholarship and pursuing philosophical theory for their own sake. He argued that scholarship should be re-focused on more important concerns such as music, ritual, and law. This was not only an intellectual but also a political assertion: he argued that the gwageo examinations by which people qualified for royal service should be reformed to focus on these concerns.

Ye Philosophy
Ye philosophy takes up a large portion of the writings of Jeong Yak-yong. As demonstrated by the fact that the original title of Gyeongse Yupyo (경세유표, 經世遺表, Design for Good Government), a flagship work of his which presents a blueprint of state management, was Bangnye Chobon (Draft for the Country's Rites), Jeong uses the concept of Ye extensively to represent what he aims to achieve with his thought. He focuses this concept on his notion of good government and later extended and branched into his works of classical studies and natural sciences.

Theory of Sacrificial Rites
Dasan's theory of Korean-style sacrificial rites shows his socio-political concern seeking for the rule of virtue and righteous government. He intended to motivate people into making everyday practices of the human imperatives and to revitalize effectively the traditional society of the late period of Joseon dynasty which had its basis upon Ye (禮, Confucian order). In Mokminsimseo, Dasan formulates the cognitive process of ritual practice focussing on sacrificial rites as follows.

1) The cognition of the ritual object raises the intentional movement of mind/heart toward the ritual object in the cognitive process.

2) The intentionality of mind and heart entails reverence and purification in the ritual process. Ritual practice is significant through sincerity (성, 誠) and seriousness (경, 敬). From the perspective of the cognitive science of religion, Dasan's theory relates cognition with intentional piety in the cognitive process, and combines intentional piety and reverence/purification in ritual practice. Dasan intended to regulate the excessive ritual practices of the literati and restrict popular licentious cults (음사, 淫祀) in accordance with his cognitive formula. From his point of view, Confucianist's ritual conceptions were improper or impractical, and popular licentious cults were impious and overly enthusiastic. In order to solve these problems, He redefined Zhi Hsi's concept of seriousness as attentive concentration of convergent piety into the concept of prudential reverence as intentional pietism. Zhi Hsi's concept of seriousness contains apophatic mysticism like Zen Buddhist Quietism (정, 靜) by mediation, but Dasan's concept of reverence is inclined towards Cataphatic activism by contemplation.

Land reform
Land reform was an important issue for the Silhak reformers, and Dasan elaborated upon Yu Hyŏngwŏn's land reform proposals. Rather than central state ownership, Dasan proposed a "village land system," in which the village would hold its land in common and farm the land as a whole, while the products of the land would be divided based on the amount of labor contributed.

Views on Dasan
Professor Ogawa Haruhisa of Nishogakusha University in Tokyo is very impressed by Dasan:

Professor Peng Lin at Qinghua University, Beijing teaches the Chinese classics and has a special interest in Dasan's study of rituals. He published in the 1980s research papers on Dasan in the Sônggyun’gwan Journal of East Asian Studies:

Professor Don Baker at the Asia Center of the University of British Columbia, Canada, is interested in Dasan for his role as an intellectual in a period of transition:

There is in Korea a revival of Jeong Yak-yong's thought never seen before on that scale for any Korean philosopher. In the not distant past one could hear doubts about even the existence of a Korean philosophy. Since the liberation of Korea in 1945 Western philosophy has prevailed and philosophy departments in most Korean universities teach mainly European modern philosophy. Therefore, Dasan is of great importance as he was able to be enthusiastic for modern Western ideas but remained deeply committed to the depth of Confucianism. He was not defending a tradition for its own sake but wanted to keep the precious values of the early Chinese period because it was a foundation for man and society.

Family
Father: Jeong Jae-won (정재원, 丁載遠; 1730–1792) 
Grandfather: Jeong Ji-hae (정지해, 丁志諧; 1712–1756)
Grandmother: Lady, of the Pungsan Hong clan (부인 풍산 홍씨; 1712–1753) – daughter of Hong Gil-bo (홍길보, 洪吉輔).
Uncle: Jeong Jae-un (정재운, 丁載運); became the adopted son of his uncle, Jeong Ji-yeol (정지열, 丁志說).
Uncle: Jeong Jae-jin (정재진, 丁載進)
Mother:
Biological: Lady Yun So-on of the Haenam Yun clan (윤소온, 尹小溫, 부인 해남 윤씨; 1728–1770); daughter of Yun Deok-ryeol (윤덕렬, 尹德烈).
Older brother: Jeong Yak-jeon (정약전, 丁若銓; 1758–1816)
Older sister-in-law: Lady, of the Pungsan Kim clan (부인 풍산 김씨); daughter of Kim Seo-gu (김서구, 金敍九)
Nephew: Jeong Hak-cho (정학초, 丁學樵; 1791–1807)
Nephew: Jeong Hak-mu (정학무, 丁學武)
Grandnephew: Jeong Dae-bin (정대빈, 丁大彬)
Nephew: Jeong Hak-seung (정학승, 丁學乘); became the adopted son of his uncle, Jeong Yak-hwang (정약황).
Older brother: Jeong Yak-jong (정약종, 丁若鍾; 1760–1801)
Older sister-in-law: Lady, of the Gyeongju Choi clan (부인 경주 최씨)
Niece: Lady Jeong (부인 정씨)
Nephew-in-law: Bae Yun-mun (배윤문, 裵允文) of the Dalseong Bae clan.
Older sister-in-law: Lady, of the Hansan Yi clan (부인 한산 이씨); daughter of Yi Su-jeong (이수정, 李秀廷).
Nephew: Jeong Cheol-sang (정철상, 丁哲祥; d. 1801) – baptised name "Garollo" (가롤로).
Older sister-in-law: Lady Yu So-sa (유소사, 柳召史; d. 1839) – baptised name "Cecillia" (체칠리아).
Nephew: Jeong Ha-sang (정하상, 丁夏祥; d. 1839) – baptised name "Paolo" (바오로).
Niece: Lady Jeong Jeong-hye (정정혜, 丁情惠; d. 1839) – baptised name "Ellisabeth" (엘리샤벳).
Older sister: Lady Jeong (부인 정씨)
Older brother-in-law: Yi Seung-hun (이승훈, 李承薰) of the Pyeongchang Yi clan
Older sister: Lady Jeong (부인 정씨)
Older brother-in-law: Chae Hong-geun (채홍근, 蔡弘謹) of the Pyeonggang Chae clan
Older sister: Lady Jeong (부인 정씨)
Older brother-in-law: Yi Jung-sik (이중식, 李重植) of the Yeonan Yi clan
Adoptive: Lady, of the Uiryeong Nam clan (부인 의령 남씨 ; 1729–1752); daughter of Nam Ha-deok (남하덕, 南夏德).
Half older brother: Jeong Yak-hyeon (정약현, 丁若鉉; 1751–1821)
Half older sister-in-law: Lady Yi (부인 이씨); older sister of Yi-Byeok (이벽, 李檗).
Adoptive: Lady Kim (부인 김씨; 1754–1813) 
Half younger brother: Jeong Yak-hoing (정약횡, 丁若鐄; 1785–1829)
Wives and children:
Lady, of the Pungsan Hong clan (부인 풍산 홍씨; 1761–1839)
Unnamed 1st daughter (miscarriage in July 1781 after four days from her birth)
1st son: Jeong Hak-yeon (정학연, 丁學淵; 1783–1859); childhood name was "Mu-jang" (무장, 武䍧) and "Mu-a" (무아, 武兒)
1st grandson: Jeong Dae-rim (정대림, 丁大林; 1807–1895)
1st granddaughter: Lady Jeong (부인 정씨); married Gim Hyeong-muk (김형묵, 金亨默) of the Cheongpung Gim clan.
2nd son: Jeong Hak-yu (정학유, 丁學游; 1786–1855); childhood name was "Mun-jang" (문장, 文䍧) and "Mun-a" (문아, 文兒)
Daughter-in-law: Lady, of the Cheongsong Sim clan (부인 청송 심씨); daughter of Sim-O (심오, 沈澳) and great-granddaughter of Sim-Gak (심각, 沈瑴)
1st grandson: Jeong Dae-mu (정대무, 丁大懋; b. 1824); married Lady, of the Cheongsong Sim clan (부인 청송 심씨), the daughter of Sim Dong-ryang (심동량, 沈東亮).
2nd grandson: Jeong Dae-beon (정대번, 丁大樊; b. 1833)
3rd grandson: Jeong Dae-cho (정대초, 丁大楚; 1835–1904)
1st granddaughter: Lady Jeong (부인 정씨); married Im U-sang (임우상, 任祐常) of the Pungcheon Im clan.
2nd granddaughter: Lady Jeong (부인 정씨); married Gang Eun-ju (강은주, 姜恩周) of the Haenam Gang clan.
3rd son: died young due to a Smallpox (1789–1791); childhood name was "Gu-jang" (구장, 懼䍧) and "Gu-ak" (구악, 懼岳)
2nd daughter: died young due to a Smallpox (1792–1794); childhood name was "Hyo-sun" (효순, 孝順) and "Ho-dong" (호동, 好童)
3rd daughter: Lady Jeong (부인 정씨; b. 1793)
Son-in-law: Yun Chang-mo (윤창모, 尹昌模; 1795–1856); the son of Jeong Yak-yong's friend, Yun Seo-yu (윤서유, 尹書有); they married in 1812.
4th son: died young due to a Smallpox (1796–1798); childhood name was "Sam-dong" (삼동, 三童)
5th son: died young due to a Smallpox (1798–1798)
6th son: died young due to a Smallpox (1799–1802); childhood name was "Nong-jang" (농장, 農䍧) and "Nong-a" (농아, 農兒)
Concubine Nam Dang-ne (첩 남당네); as a concubine who lived in exile, she was presumed to be the author of the Chinese poem "Namdangsa" (남당사) – No issue.

In popular culture 
 Portrayed by Kim Myung-gon in the 1994 film The Eternal Empire.
 Portrayed by Song Chang-eui in the 2007 MBC TV series Lee San, Wind of the Palace.
 Portrayed by Park Jung-chul in the 2007 CGV TV series Eight Days, Assassination Attempts against King Jeongjo.
 Portrayed by Ahn Nae-sang in the 2010 KBS2 TV series Sungkyunkwan Scandal and 2016 KBS2 TV series Love in the Moonlight.
 Portrayed by Chun Bo-geun and Song Joong-ki in the 2012 film The Grand Heist.

See also
Hwaseong Fortress
Jeongjo of Joseon
Jeong Yak-jong
Korean Confucianism
Korean philosophy
Silhak
Roman Catholicism in South Korea

References

Print

Online

External links
Encyclopedia of Korean culture-Jeong yak yong

1762 births
1836 deaths
18th-century agronomists
18th-century Korean philosophers
18th-century Korean poets
19th-century agronomists
19th-century Korean philosophers
19th-century Korean poets
Korean Confucianists
People from Gwangju, Gyeonggi